Henry Spies (June 12, 1866 – July 7, 1942), was a Major League Baseball player who played catcher and first base in the National League in 1895 for the Cincinnati Reds and Louisville Colonels. His minor league playing career began in 1889 and ended in 1907.

External links

1866 births
1942 deaths
Major League Baseball catchers
Major League Baseball first basemen
Louisville Colonels players
Cincinnati Reds players
19th-century baseball players
Hamilton Hams players
Sacramento Senators players
San Francisco Metropolitans players
San Francisco Frisco players
Grand Rapids Rippers players
St. Paul Apostles players
St. Paul Saints (Western League) players
Cleveland Lake Shores players
Milwaukee Brewers (minor league) players
Los Angeles Angels (minor league) players
San Francisco Seals (baseball) players
Sioux City Packers players
Baseball players from Louisiana